Fairview is an American adult animated satirical sitcom created by R.J. Fried and executive produced by The Late Show host Stephen Colbert. It premiered on Comedy Central on February 9, 2022.

Synopsis 
In a world inhabited by anthropomorphic nesting dolls, the series focuses how national politics interact with the dysfunctional citizens of a town named Fairview, a town of idiotic party people who are willing to urinate in public and fight in car park lots. Overseeing this is Kelly Sampson, a former party girl turned mayor (who is not the smartest person in the book), and her fellow incompetent political figures and their families.

Cast and characters
 Marina Cockenberg as Kelly Sampson
 Aparna Nancherla as Chelsea Hill
 Jack Bensinger as Glen Michaels
 Jeremy Levick as Todd Osterdorff
 Blair Socci as Holly Osterdorff
 James Austin Johnson as Beef Osterdorff
 R.J. Fried as Jake
 Graham Techler as Breckman
 Atsuko Okatsuka as Mary
 Otter Lee as Mack
 Carl Foreman Jr. as Wade Moonman
 Lisa Gilroy
 Joey Romaine
 Mitch Lewis

Production
The series was animated using Adobe After Effects software, which was picked up and greenlit by Comedy Central on October 7, 2021, with a slate premiere for early 2022. On January 27, 2022, it was announced that the series would premiere on February 9, 2022.

Episodes

References

External links
 Official website

2022 American television series debuts
2022 American television series endings
Comedy Central animated television series
2020s American adult animated television series
2020s American political comedy television series
2020s American satirical television series
2020s American sitcoms
American animated sitcoms
Animated adult television sitcoms
American adult animated comedy television series
American adult animated television spin-offs
American flash adult animated television series
Animated satirical television series
Fiction about social issues
Political satirical television series
Stephen Colbert
Television series by CBS Studios